Indoreonectes is a genus of stone loaches native to the Western Ghats in India.

Species
There are currently five recognized species in this genus:
 Indoreonectes evezardi (F. Day, 1872)
 Indoreonectes keralensis (Rita & Nalbant, 1978)
Indoreonectes neeleshi Kumkar, Pise, Gorule, Verma & Kalous, 2021
Indoreonectes rajeevi Kumkar, Pise, Gorule, Verma & Kalous, 2021
Indoreonectes telanganaensis

References

Nemacheilidae
Taxa named by Teodor T. Nalbant
Taxonomy articles created by Polbot